Alessandro D'Errico (born 18 November 1950) is an Italian prelate of the Catholic Church. He has spent his career in the diplomatic service of the Holy See and has been the Apostolic Nuncio to Libya and to Malta from 2017 to 2022.

Biography 
Alessandro D'Errico was born in the Frattamaggiore comune of the Metropolitan City of Naples on 18 November 1950 to Alberto and Rosa née Vitale, the first of five children. He studied at the seminary in Aversa and was ordained a priest of the Diocese of Aversa on 24 March 1974. He then earned a degree in philosophy at the University of Naples and a licenciate in canon law at the Pontifical Lateran University, and a bachelor’s in theology at the San Luigi Papal Theological Seminary of Southern Italy. Finally he earned a diploma from the Pontifical Ecclesiastical Academy.

He entered the diplomatic service of the Holy See on 5 March 1977 and filled positions in Thailand (1977-1981), Brazil (1981-1984), Greece (1984-1986), Italy (1987-1992), and Poland (1992-1998).

On 14 November 1998, Pope John Paul II named him titular archbishop of Carini and Apostolic Nuncio to Pakistan.

He received his episcopal consecration from Pope John Paul on 6 January 1999.

On 21 November 2005, Pope Benedict XVI appointed him Nuncio to Bosnia-Herzegovina.

On 17 February 2010, Benedict named him Nuncio to Montenegro.

On 21 May 2012, Benedict named him Nuncio to Croatia.
 
On 27 April 2017, Pope Francis appointed him Nuncio to Malta and on 10 June 2017 Nuncio to Libya as well.

Pope Francis accepted his resignation from his posts as nuncio on 30 April 2022.

See also
 List of heads of the diplomatic missions of the Holy See

References

 

 

 

 

1950 births
Living people
Clergy from Naples
21st-century Italian Roman Catholic titular archbishops
Apostolic Nuncios to Bosnia and Herzegovina
Apostolic Nuncios to Croatia
Apostolic Nuncios to Malta
Apostolic Nuncios to Libya
Apostolic Nuncios to Pakistan
Apostolic Nuncios to Montenegro
Pontifical Lateran University alumni
Pontifical Ecclesiastical Academy alumni
Diplomats from Naples
Italian expatriates in Pakistan